Kara-Oy is a village in the Talas Region of Kyrgyzstan. It is part of the Talas District. Its population was 2,572 in 2021.

References

Populated places in Talas Region